HGK or Hgk may refer to:

 HGK (bomb), a bomb guidance kit
 Croatian Chamber of Economy
 General Command of Mapping (Turkey)
 Häfen und Güterverkehr Köln, a harbour and rail company of the City of Cologne, Germany
 Hgk, a GUI interface for the computer development software Mercurial; see Comparison of version-control software
 "H-G-K", a song by Band-Maid from the 2021 album Unseen World

See also
 HKG (disambiguation)